China Resources Holdings Company Limited, or simply China Resources, is a Chinese state-owned conglomerate that owns a variety of businesses in Hong Kong and Mainland China. Some of its subsidiaries use the name in the form of the acronym CRC.

History
The company started as Liow & Company in Hong Kong in 1938. Its original purpose was to raise funds and purchase supplies and equipment for the Eighth Route Army and later People's Liberation Army, then engaged in the Chinese Civil War. It was renamed as China Resources Corporation in 1948.  In 1983, the company was incorporated as China Resources (Holdings) Company Limited.

Operations
The company's main business focus is the export of mainland Chinese products (including energy) to Hong Kong. Its retail operations are organised under the China Resources Retail group, and include Chinese Arts & Crafts; it also runs a number of supermarkets in Hong Kong, originally under the CRC name, but now rebranded as Vanguard. It also owns Ng Fung Hong, the monopoly meat importer into Hong Kong.

China Resources Cement is the largest NSP clinker and cement producer in Southern China by production capacity and the second largest concrete producer in China by sales volume. It was established in 2003 and incorporated in Cayman Islands.

Rank
According to Fortune Magazine, China Resources was ranked 70th on the 2022 Fortune Global 500 list, improved 73 places since 2014.

Investigation
In 2013 the firm and its chairman at the time, Song Lin, who also held high government rank, was reported to be under investigation regarding the purchase of coal mines in Shanxi province for 9.9 billion RMB that did not produce any coal for several years after the acquisition. There are substantial reserves of coal in the mines, but exploiting them requires substantial investments. Meanwhile, coal from newly opened strip mines in Mongolia had depressed the market. The deal raised questions about the leverage that large, state-owned firms had to borrow money at low interest for projects of dubious profitability and about where the money went and why.

See also
China Resources Beer
CR Vanguard
China Resources Power
China Resources Land
China Resources Gas (CR Petroleum Company Limited sold to Sinopec 2007)
China Resources Cement
China Resources Tower
China Resources Beverage
China Resources Alcohol Corporation
Ng Fung Hong

Notes and references

External links

 
Conglomerate companies of Hong Kong
Conglomerate companies of China
Government-owned companies of China
Supermarkets of Hong Kong
Conglomerate companies established in 1948
1948 establishments in Hong Kong